Pack Up the Plantation: Live! is the first official live album by Tom Petty and the Heartbreakers, released in November 1985. It was primarily recorded at the Wiltern Theatre in Los Angeles during their 1985 tour but also includes several tracks from previous tours. It was released as a double LP or single cassette and compact disc.

A concert film of the Wiltern Theatre performance, also titled Pack Up the Plantation: Live! was released on home video in 1986. It included songs that did not make the album, such as originals "Don't Do Me Like That" and "Don't Come Around Here No More", as well as covers such as "Little Bit O' Soul" and "Route 66".

Stevie Nicks, who has collaborated with Petty and has appeared with him on tour frequently, sings with Petty on two songs on the album. The first is a cover of the Searchers' 1964 hit "Needles and Pins," which was released as a single and climbed into the Billboard top 40. Nicks' second track is "Insider," one of two cuts from Petty's 1981 LP Hard Promises that feature her.

No other singles were released from the album in the United States, although a cover of the Byrds' 1967 hit "So You Want to Be a Rock 'n' Roll Star" was released in Europe. "Refugee" was also issued in Europe on a four-track EP. Another fan favorite, "Breakdown," appears at the end of side one. It is notable because the audience takes over from Petty at the start, singing the first two verses and the chorus loud enough to be picked up by the mics. He quipped, "You're going to put me out of a job" to huge applause, and then launches into a reprise of the second verse.

The recording garnered somewhat mixed reviews, with Sandy Robertson, writing for Sounds, describing it as "a turgid four-sided video soundtrack". Jimmy Guterman, writing for Rolling Stone, said that Petty "sounds impassioned and impressive when he lays into his early songs" and that the Heartbreakers are "an undeniably great band."

Track listing

The cover songs "So You Want to Be a Rock 'n' Roll Star" and "Don't Bring Me Down" would later appear on Playback; "So You Want to Be a Rock 'n' Roll Star" also shows up on Anthology: Through the Years. The two songs appearing only on vinyl or cassette have never been officially released on CD. Both songs were also initially not included in the 2015 Hi-Rez remaster, despite being a digital download without time limits, but after fan response, they were belatedly added to the release.

Recording information

All tracks recorded at the Wiltern Theatre, Los Angeles, California, August 7, 1985, except,

 "Don't Bring Me Down" – Paradise Theater, Boston, July 16, 1978
 "Stories We Could Tell" – Hammersmith Odeon, London, England, March 7, 1980, engineered by Charles Kaplan in the Mobile Manor Unit
 "Needles and Pins" & "Insider" – The Forum, Los Angeles, June 1981
 "Shout" – The Coliseum, Richfield, Ohio, March 19, 1983
 "Rockin' Around (With You)" – Irvine Meadows Amphitheatre, Irvine, California, June 1983

Personnel
Tom Petty & the Heartbreakers

Tom Petty – lead vocals, 6 and 12-string electric guitars, acoustic guitar 
Mike Campbell – lead guitar, 12-string, lap steel, slide guitars
Benmont Tench – keyboards, vocals
Howie Epstein – bass, mandolin, harmony vocals
Stan Lynch – drums, vocals

Additional musicians

Ron Blair – bass on "Insider", "Needles and Pins", "Stories We Could Tell", "Don't Bring Me Down"
Phil Jones – percussion on "Insider", "Needles and Pins", "Rockin' Around (With You)", "Shout"
Bobby Valentino – violin on "Stories We Could Tell"
Stevie Nicks – vocals on "Insider", "Needles and Pins"

Soul Lips Horns (on tracks recorded at the Wiltern Theater)
 Jimmy Zavala – saxes, harmonica
 Lee Thornburg – trumpets, flugel horn
 Nick Lane – trombones, euphonium

The Rebeletts (on tracks recorded at the Wiltern Theater)
 Pat Peterson – backing vocals, percussion
 Caroll Sue Hill – backing vocals, percussion

Production

 Mike Campbell - production
 Tom Petty - production
 Don Smith - engineer
 Alan Weidel - assistant engineer

Charts 
Weekly Charts

References

Tom Petty live albums
Albums produced by Tom Petty
1986 live albums
MCA Records live albums
Albums recorded at the Wiltern Theatre